Comarum is a genus of plants formerly included with the genus Potentilla ("typical cinquefoils"). It contains one or two species:
 Comarum palustre – marsh cinquefoil, swamp cinquefoil
 Comarum salesowianum (sometimes considered as the monotypic genus Farinopsis.)

See also 
 Fragaria × Comarum hybrids

Footnotes

External links

Potentilleae
Rosaceae genera